Bernard L. Shaw was an English footballer who played for Sheffield United as a forward. Born 'locally' Shaw was an amateur player who guested for both The Wednesday and Sheffield United on occasions as allowed by FA rules at the time.  Although more often used in friendly fixtures he did represent United in both the FA Cup and the Midland Counties League.

Work took Shaw to London in 1891 after which he made occasional guest appearances for Woolwich Arsenal over the following two seasons.

References

Association football defenders
English footballers
Sheffield F.C. players
Sheffield United F.C. players
Arsenal F.C. players
Year of birth missing
Year of death missing
Place of birth missing
Midland Football League players